Barakuh Rural District is in Jolgeh-ye Mazhan District of Khusf County, South Khorasan province, Iran. At the National Census of 2006, its population (as a part of the former Khusf District of Birjand County) was 3,919 in 1,283 households. There were 2,496 inhabitants in 946 households at the following census of 2011.

At the most recent census of 2016, the population of the rural district was 2,406 in 913 households. The largest of its 68 villages was Gol, with 489 people, by which time the district had been separated from the county and Khusf County established with two new districts..

References 

Khusf County

Rural Districts of South Khorasan Province

Populated places in South Khorasan Province

Populated places in Khusf County